Ya Hala Lebanese Cuisine, or simply Ya Hala, is a Lebanese and Middle Eastern restaurant in Portland, Oregon.

Description
Ya Hala ("welcome" in Lebanese) is a Lebanese and Middle Eastern restaurant in the southeast Portland part of the Montavilla neighborhood. Martin Cizmar of Willamette Week has described the restaurant as "cavernous". Lauren Carlos and Michelle DeVona of Eater Portland wrote, "Huge murals grace the walls at this homey ... standby, where visitors find homestyle Lebanese food as well as classic street fare".In 2013, The Astorian said the menu "offers Lebanese food that you might eat in someone's home, rather than the more standard fare". The menu has included falafel, shakshuka, pita and hummus, lamb bacon and shanks, meatballs, eggs, sujuk, and beef kafta kebabs, and burgers with arugula, eggplant, and tahini-Dijon dressing on a brioche bun.

Portland Monthly says, "At its new brunch, this Montavilla standby takes a detour from its Middle East playbook. Instead, the restaurant spice-routes American greasy-spoon dishes alongside pots of fragrant Turkish coffee and traditional Lebanese breakfast fare." Ya Hala used the Lebanese coffee brand Najjar, as of 2001.

In 2003, The Oregonian described the restaurant's exterior as "inviting" and "plant-adorned".

History
The family-owned restaurant was established as a deli counter in 1999. The Attar family also own Barbur World Foods and International Food Supply. Mirna and John Attar are co-owners; Mirna also serves as chef, as of 2020. She is the daughter of Nicholas Restaurant founders Nicholas and Linda Dibe, and the sister of Hoda Khouri, the owner and chef of Hoda's. Pascal Attar is also associated with Ya Hala.

Ya Hala began serving brunch in 2015. The restaurant's exterior was painted in 2016. In 2021, Ya Hala's marquee logo was repainted, with the text "Ya Hala Lebanese Plates – Established 1999" changed to "ya hala" in lower case. Ya Hala participated in the Portland Bloody Mary Festival, which was hosted by the Bloody Mary Liberation Party at Redd on Salmon Street, in 2019.

Reception

In 2003, The Oregonian called Ya Hala "a Lebanese restaurant also on the top of many critics' lists". The newspaper said in 2004: 

In 2008, The Oregonian said, "Every neighborhood should be so lucky to have a family diner like this: loud and bustling, with well-priced, piled-high plates of Lebanese food and a Mideast grocery store next door. Best dishes are found in the meze and grill sections." Michael Russell included the restaurant in the newspaper's 2019 "ultimate guide to Portland's 40 best brunches". In Walking Portland (2019), Becky Ohlsen called Ya Hala "an excellent choice if you're hungry" and said the restaurant was among the first established along a particular stretch of Southeast Stark Street.

In 2015, Benjamin Tepler of Portland Monthly said Ya Hala was "widely considered one of the city's best Middle Eastern restaurants". Ya Hala was a runner-up in the Best Mediterranean Restaurant category of Willamette Week annual 'Best of Portland' reader's poll in In 2016, 2017, and 2022. In the newspaper's 2019 list of the 10 "best places to get hummus in Portland", Shannon Gormley described the hummus as "a wholesome treat" with a "rich, nutty flavor and unobtrusive consistency". Alex Frane selected Ya Hala for Montavilla in Thrillist's 2019 list of the "best brunch spots in 17 Portland neighborhoods".

The restaurant has been included in multiple lists published by Eater Portland, including Chad Walsh's 2016 list of "Portland restaurants with killer delivery options", Nick Woo's 2020 overview of "where to find saucy shakshuka in Portland", and Lauren Carlos and Michelle DeVona's 2020 overview of "where to find next-level hummus in Portland". In the website's 2022 overview of recommended eateries in Montavilla, Alex Frane and Nathan Williams wrote, "A stucco wall painted with faux windows adds an immersive charm to Ya Hala, one of the city's best Lebanese restaurants. Most nights of the week, families and couples on dates fill its dining room, with tables covered in baba ghanoush, shawarma, lamb sausages, rice-stuffed grape leaves, and much more."

See also

 List of Lebanese restaurants
 List of Middle Eastern restaurants

References

External links

 
 Ya Hala Lebanese Cuisine at Zomato

Asian restaurants in Portland, Oregon
Lebanese restaurants
Lebanese-American culture in Oregon
Middle Eastern restaurants in the United States
Middle Eastern-American culture in Portland, Oregon
Montavilla, Portland, Oregon
Southeast Portland, Oregon